is a retired judoka who competed in the 1976 Summer Olympics.

Biography
After graduating from Tenri University, Ninomiya entered the Shoki Juku under the instruction of Isao Okano. He joined the Fukuoka Prefecture police force in April 1972, and placed third in the All-Japan Judo Championships that year. He won a gold medal in the heavyweight division of the Asian Judo Championships in 1970 and the open weight division of the 1973 World Judo Championships held in Lausanne, Switzerland by defeating future Olympic gold medalist Haruki Uemura. He won another gold medal at the 1975 World Championships and won the All-Japan Judo Championships for the first time in 1976 to qualify for the 1976 Summer Olympics. However, the Japanese Olympic team had already decided on Haruki Uemura and Sumio Endo as the representatives for the free weight and heavyweight divisions, and Ninomiya was forced to enter the competition as a half heavyweight (-93 kg), shedding over 7 kg from his usual competitive weight. Regardless, Ninomiya used his long reach and height (at 6 ft. 2 in., he was considerably tall for a half heavyweight) to become the first Japanese judoka to win a gold medal in the half heavyweight division. He remains the only Japanese judoka to have won an Olympic medal in that division, aside from Kosei Inoue.

Ninomiya retired after competing in the 1978 Jigoro Kano Cup along with Isamu Sonoda. He and Sonoda were rivals and friends for over 30 years, having been born on the same year, entered the same police force, competed in the same World Championships and Olympics, and having retired at the same time. After serving as an advisor for several local and prefectural level judo committees, he became a judo instructor at the Nishinippon Institute of Technology in 2007.

See also
 List of judoka
 List of Olympic medalists in judo

References

Ninomiya joined under Isao Okano's instruction in the Dojo called "Seiki Juku."

External links
 

1946 births
Living people
Japanese male judoka
Judoka at the 1976 Summer Olympics
Olympic judoka of Japan
Olympic gold medalists for Japan
Sportspeople from Fukuoka (city)
Olympic medalists in judo
Medalists at the 1976 Summer Olympics
Universiade medalists in judo
Universiade gold medalists for Japan
Medalists at the 1967 Summer Universiade